Shaun Weatherhead (born 3 September 1970) is an English former professional footballer who played as a defender in the Football League for York City, in non-League football for Accrington Stanley and was on the books of Huddersfield Town without making a league appearance. After leaving York City he played in Hong Kong, China, and South Africa, before ending his career back in England with Accrington Stanley.

Career statistics

References

1970 births
Living people
Footballers from Halifax, West Yorkshire
English footballers
Association football defenders
Huddersfield Town A.F.C. players
York City F.C. players
Accrington Stanley F.C. players
English Football League players
English expatriate footballers
Expatriate footballers in China
Expatriate footballers in Hong Kong
Expatriate soccer players in South Africa
English expatriate sportspeople in China
English expatriate sportspeople in Hong Kong
English expatriate sportspeople in South Africa